The 1896 United States presidential election in Connecticut took place on November 3, 1896 as part of the 1896 United States presidential election. Voters chose six representatives, or electors to the Electoral College, who voted for president and vice president.

Connecticut voted for the Republican nominee, former Governor of Ohio William McKinley, over the Democratic nominee, former U.S. Representative from Nebraska William Jennings Bryan. McKinley won the state by a margin of 30.7%. This was the first time a Republican carried Connecticut in a presidential election since James A. Garfield did so 16 years earlier.

William Bryan, running on a platform of free silver, appealed strongly to Western miners and farmers in the 1896 election, but held little appeal in the Northeastern states like Connecticut.

Results

See also
 United States presidential elections in Connecticut

References

Connecticut
1896
1896 Connecticut elections